Astragalus hoantchy, the Urad huang qi, is a species of flowering plant in the family Fabaceae, native to China; Gansu, Inner Mongolia, Ningxia, and Qinghai. It is widely cultivated for use in Chinese and Mongolian traditional medicine.

References

hoantchy
Endemic flora of China
Flora of Inner Mongolia
Flora of Gansu
Flora of Qinghai
Plants described in 1883